Anton Aleksandrovich Ivanov (born 19 November 1987) is a Russian badminton player. Partnered with Ivan Sozonov in the men's doubles event, they reach the semifinals round at the 2006 Latvia Riga International, and the runner-up at the 2007 Slovak International. He also the semifinalist at the 2008 Bulgarian International, and the runner-up at the 2009 Estonian International with Andrey Ashmarin. He also competed in the men's singles event, and his best result in the international tournament was the semifinalist at the 2012 Polish Open and 2013 White Nights. In 2014, he represented Russian team competed at the Thomas Cup. Ivanov was the runner-up at the 2014 national championships, and in 2015, he won the national men's singles title at the Russian Cup tournament.

Ivanov educated economy at the Moscow State Forest University, and in 2015, he competed at the Summer Universiade in Gwangju, South Korea.

Achievements

BWF International Challenge/Series
Men's doubles

 BWF International Challenge tournament
 BWF International Series tournament
 BWF Future Series tournament

References

External links 

1987 births
Living people
Badminton players from Moscow
Russian male badminton players